Donald Morrison (1858 – June 19, 1894) was a Canadian outlaw, convicted of manslaughter, who became a folk hero.

Morrison was the son of Scottish immigrants to Canada from the Isle of Lewis, born in the Canadian Gaelic-speaking immigrant community near Lac-Mégantic in Quebec, Canada. At the age of 20, Donald moved to Western Canada and the United States where he learned the cowboy trade, and became skilled both with guns and horses. The money he earned was sent home to help pay for the family farm.

Unfortunately, Donald's father Murdo Morrison mortgaged the homestead to Lieutenant Colonel Malcolm MacAulay, who took advantage of Murdo's illiteracy and cheated him out of his farm. When Donald returned home he hired a lawyer and tried to keep them from losing the farm. Nevertheless, the farm was sold and the Morrisons were evicted. Donald was angry enough to harass the new owners at this point, and when the barn burned down, a warrant was issued for his arrest for arson.

The longest manhunt in Canadian history then followed. An unsavory American special constable and whiskey smuggler named Jack Warren was called in to capture Donald, bragging that he could outshoot him; he paid with his life.

Donald was hunted in the wilds of Lac-Mégantic from June 1888 until April 1889; for 10 months he evaded lawmen. Much of the time he was hidden by sympathetic supporters in the Scotstown community. At times he passed by detectives with such cool reserve that they did not suspect him, unwittingly having him inches within their grasp.

A truce was finally arranged, but Donald was ambushed and shot. He was arrested and tried in Sherbrooke, Quebec, and although he had acted in self-defense was convicted of manslaughter and sentenced to 18 years hard labour. The worst punishment of all was the removal of his freedom, and he stopped eating, contracting tuberculosis. He died four hours after being released from prison (on clemency), and was buried on the Stornoway road in the Gisla cemetery in Megantic.

A yearly festival is held in the Donald Morrison domaine to commemorate Donald Morrison and the Scottish Gaelic-speaking pioneers of the Megantic area.  His story was romanticized in poem-form in the book The Canadian Outlaw (1892) by Oscar Dhu (Angus Mackay), Donald Morrison 'The Megantic Outlaw''' (1948) by Henry G. Kidd, Ron Kelly's 1971 television film The Megantic Outlaw, and in The Outlaw of Megantic (1973) by Bernard Epps. His life is the subject of a Gaelic-language concept album The Megantic Outlaw (2007) by Calum Martin.

The 78th Fraser Highlanders Pipe Band has issued a CD entitled, "The Megantic Outlaw Concert."

Gallery

References

 Stanford, Richard (2003) At Any Price: The Story of the Megantic Outlaw'' The Beaver Canada's History Magazine, Winnipeg. October/November 2003

External links
Information on Gaelic Settlers from the Outer Hebrides to Eastern Quebec, including Donald Morrison
Eastern Townships, Quebec
Donald Morrison web page
Siol nan Gaidheal
Canadian Encyclopedia entry 
The Hunted Outlaw: Donald Morrison, the Canadian Rob Roy (Book)
  "At Any Price:The Story of the Megantic Outlaw"

1858 births
1894 deaths
Canadian folklore
Canadian Gaelic
Canadian outlaws
Canadian people convicted of manslaughter
Canadian prisoners and detainees
19th-century deaths from tuberculosis
Tuberculosis deaths in Quebec
Persons of National Historic Significance (Canada)
Prisoners and detainees of Canada
19th-century Canadian criminals
People from Lac-Mégantic, Quebec